Dichomeris simaoensis is a moth in the family Gelechiidae. It was described by Hou-Hun Li and Hong-Jian Wang in 1997. It is found in China (Hong Kong, Tibet, Yunnan) and Thailand.

The wingspan is 18–21 mm. The forewings are ochreous brown with a dark oblique blotch at one-third, a small dot at two-thirds of the cell and the costal margin with a black triangular blotch medially. There are several small dots at the distal one-third and on the termen. The hindwings are greyish brown, with the basal half of the costal margin greyish white.

References

Moths described in 1997
simaoensis